The Warwick Daily Times was a daily newspaper covering Warwick, Rhode Island, United States, although its offices are in West Warwick. It is owned by RISN Operations Inc.

The Daily Times was founded in 2006 as a companion to the Kent County Daily Times, also based in West Warwick, which covers the other four towns of Kent County, Rhode Island.

History
The Kent County paper was founded in 1892 as the Pawtuxet Valley Daily Times, switching to its current name in the 1980s. In 1999, it was acquired by Journal Register Company.

The Warwick newspaper was launched in May 2006, following the closure of the Providence Journal news bureau in Warwick. The Daily Times newspapers added 15 new staff members to accommodate the expansion.

In 2007, a new company, RISN, formed to purchase Journal Register's Rhode Island properties, including the Daily Times newspapers. Shortly after the sale, the newspaper decreased its staff and was reduced to two eight-page sections. By July 26, 2007, the last edition of the Warwick Daily Times was published.

Sisters and competitors 
In its coverage area, Daily Times competes with the state's largest daily, the Providence Journal.

RISN (which stands for Rhode Island Suburban Newspapers) also owns three other daily newspapers in Rhode Island, The Call of Woonsocket, The Times of Pawtucket and the Kent County Daily Times, as well as several weekly newspapers. All of these properties were sold for $8.3 million to RISN in early 2007 by Journal Register Company.

References

External links
 RICentral.com -- Times Website
 -- Online portfolio of former Warwick Daily Times staff photographer Ryan T. Conaty

Defunct newspapers published in Rhode Island
RISN Operations
Warwick, Rhode Island
West Warwick, Rhode Island
Kent County, Rhode Island
Publishing companies established in 2006
Publishing companies established in 2007
2006 establishments in Rhode Island
2007 disestablishments in Rhode Island